The 2018 Women's Professional Lacrosse League season was the 1st season of  the Women's Professional Lacrosse League. The New England Command beat the Baltimore Brave to win the championship.

Standings

Schedule

References

Women's Professional Lacrosse League
Women's Professional Lacrosse League
Lacrosse